= Ponnagar =

Ponnagar is a neighbourhood of the city of Tiruchirappalli in Tamil Nadu, India.
